This is a list of cases reported in volume 118 of United States Reports, decided by the Supreme Court of the United States in 1886.

Justices of the Supreme Court at the time of volume 118 U.S. 

The Supreme Court is established by Article III, Section 1 of the Constitution of the United States, which says: "The judicial Power of the United States, shall be vested in one supreme Court . . .". The size of the Court is not specified; the Constitution leaves it to Congress to set the number of justices. Under the Judiciary Act of 1789 Congress originally fixed the number of justices at six (one chief justice and five associate justices). Since 1789 Congress has varied the size of the Court from six to seven, nine, ten, and back to nine justices (always including one chief justice).

When the cases in volume 118 U.S. were decided the Court comprised the following nine members:

Notable Cases in 118 U.S.

Yick Wo v. Hopkins
Yick Wo v. Hopkins,            356 (1886), was the first case in which the Supreme Court held that a law, race-neutral on its face but administered in a prejudicial manner, is an infringement of the Equal Protection Clause of the Fourteenth Amendment. By the 1950s, the Warren Court used the principle established in Yick Wo to strike down several attempts by states and municipalities in the Deep South to limit the political rights of blacks. Yick Wo has been cited in more than 150 Supreme Court cases since it was decided.

Santa Clara County v. Southern Pacific R.R. Co.
Santa Clara County v. Southern Pacific R.R. Co.,
         394 (1886), is a corporate law case concerning taxation of railroad properties. The case is most notable for a headnote written by the Supreme Court's Reporter of Decisions, Bancroft Davis, stating that the Equal Protection Clause of the Fourteenth Amendment grants constitutional protections to corporations as it does to natural persons, although the text of the decision itself does not establish this principle.

Wabash, St. Louis & Pacific Railway Co. v. Illinois
In Wabash, St. Louis & Pacific Railway Co. v. Illinois,          557 (1886), also known as the Wabash Case, the Supreme Court severely limited the rights of states to control or impede interstate commerce. The decision led to the creation of the federal Interstate Commerce Commission, the first modern regulatory agency in the United States.

Citation style 

Under the Judiciary Act of 1789 the federal court structure at the time comprised District Courts, which had general trial jurisdiction; Circuit Courts, which had mixed trial and appellate (from the US District Courts) jurisdiction; and the United States Supreme Court, which had appellate jurisdiction over the federal District and Circuit courts—and for certain issues over state courts. The Supreme Court also had limited original jurisdiction (i.e., in which cases could be filed directly with the Supreme Court without first having been heard by a lower federal or state court). There were one or more federal District Courts and/or Circuit Courts in each state, territory, or other geographical region.

Bluebook citation style is used for case names, citations, and jurisdictions.  
 e.g.,"C.C.D.N.J." = United States Circuit Court for the District of New Jersey
 e.g.,"D. Mass." = United States District Court for the District of Massachusetts 
 "E." = Eastern; "M." = Middle; "N." = Northern; "S." = Southern; "W." = Western
 e.g.,"C.C.S.D.N.Y." = United States Circuit Court for the Southern District of New York
 e.g.,"M.D. Ala." = United States District Court for the Middle District of Alabama
 "Ct. Cl." = United States Court of Claims
 The abbreviation of a state's name alone indicates the highest appellate court in that state's judiciary at the time. 
 e.g.,"Pa." = Supreme Court of Pennsylvania
 e.g.,"Me." = Supreme Judicial Court of Maine

List of cases in volume 118 U.S.

Notes and references

External links
  Case reports in volume 118 from Library of Congress
  Case reports in volume 118 from Court Listener
  Case reports in volume 118 from the Caselaw Access Project of Harvard Law School
  Case reports in volume 118 from Google Scholar
  Case reports in volume 118 from Justia
  Case reports in volume 118 from Open Jurist
 Website of the United States Supreme Court
 United States Courts website about the Supreme Court
 National Archives, Records of the Supreme Court of the United States
 American Bar Association, How Does the Supreme Court Work?
 The Supreme Court Historical Society

1886 in United States case law